Sliver & Gold is the eighth studio album by the Swedish rock band Backyard Babies, released on March 1, 2019 by Gain Music Entertainment. The band cite it as their most cohesive record to date.

On the Internet, many references mangle the name of the album by changing the first word to "Silver".

Reception
The album received generally favorable reviews, with notice from Metal Temple, Metal Report, Rock Report, and Metal Hammer.

Track listing

Personnel 
 Nicke Borg – vocals, guitar
 Dregen – lead guitar, vocals
 Johan Blomqvist – bass
 Peder Carlsson – drums

References

2019 albums
Backyard Babies albums